Jatta is a fantasy novel by Australian author and illustrator Jenny Hale. Set in an alternate world, its heroine Jatta discovers in the days before her fourteenth birthday that she is a werewolf. As the wolf inside Jatta grows, it continues to morph. When it impinges on her waking hours, Jatta realises her personality will disintegrate. Eventually none of her gentle humanity will be left.

The novel deals with themes of forgiveness and how we are sculpted by family and culture. It investigates societies by contrasting Jatta's pacifist, compassionate and vulnerable ‘Alteeda’ with the brutal, militarily successful Kingdom of Dartith. Once in Dartithan custody, both Jatta and her brother Arthmael are faced with impossible decisions: whether to choose others’ deaths, thus compromising their own souls.

Setting 
Aerth is a world not unlike our own, with Renaissance housing and fashions, archaic weapons, and twentieth-century medicine. However, for seven thousand years its kings have relied on its demi-Godlike Sorcerers for guidance. Each Sorcerer is a human entrusted from birth with wisdom and magic. Past Sorcerers have created Aerth's dragons from assortments of prehistoric bones, and have resurrected pterodactyls and created other hybrid creatures. One Sorcerer, Andro Mogon, created Undeath.
 
Thus began his three thousand-year reign. The Undead Sorcerer Andro Mogon sealed off his homeland of Dartith and created one final, nightmare breed. Wolves.

Plot summary
Princess Jatta wakes on her bedroom floor after a night's carnage she cannot remember, suffering a guilt she cannot explain. Piece by piece she uncovers two frightening truths: she is a werewolf; Dartith's King Brackensith has claimed her as bride for his son. Any protection her father's kingdom of Alteeda has offered Jatta crumbles when, on her fourteenth birthday, Brackensith invades.

Jatta and her brother Arthmael escape to seek help from Sorcerer Redd. They leave him, taking the orb. This purple, plum-sized magical ball creates vivid illusions of sight, sound, smell and taste so convincingly that only the sense of touch can expose them. 
With Jatta's own prodigious imagination she soon masters the orb. Its illusions provide almost limitless possibilities for deception, entertainment and escape. However, Jatta cannot escape the sinister werewolf episodes she now suffers.

As Brackensith's grip tightens on Alteeda, Jatta realises that only her surrender will save her kingdom. Her journey with Arthmael to Dartith's dark isle is fraught with dangers. They are kidnapped, thrown to dragons, and trapped with lost souls inside an enchanted fire. Jatta is forced into a betrothal to the dangerously unbalanced Prince Riz.
On Dartith, where night stretches for sixteen of every twenty-four hours, Jatta and Arthmael meet and befriend Princess Noriglade, Brackensith's Undead daughter. Noriglade also despises what she is. Though the Undead rarely kill, they do kidnap their victim's soul as they drink, a torturous experience for the victim and a corrupting one for the Undead.

Noriglade and Arthmael yearn to escape to Alteeda. Jatta resigns herself to staying, fearing her wolf is invading her personality. 
When mad Prince Riz stages a coup, the three young Royals are caught up in the massacre. It is Jatta’ unique powers that save them, and Jatta, Arthmael and Noriglade return to Alteeda.

Undead 
Like other magical aspects of the novel, Undeath is inspired by nature. The Undead potion is a poison, and though it kills the drinker, it also traps his departing soul in his obsidian sarcophagus slab. Every night his soul-less body is free to roam, though he naturally decays. His breath smells by night's end, and rigor mortis makes movement clumsy and jerky. Every day his body must return to lie on his slab while his soul repairs the night's decay. His near-freezing skin is the elixir's defence against flies and beetles that would otherwise lay eggs and breed maggots. It is an imperfect solution to the problem of death, but one that many Dartithans have embraced.

Wolves 
Wolves express no gender, no age, and practically no impulse except fury to devour. They do not exist except during full moon, and reproduce only by curses. They are the creatures Aerth fears most. Their jagged, jutting obsidian teeth mimic those of sharks. The armour plates beneath their hides mimic crocodile armour or dragon scales. Their instinct for tracking, their intelligence and their hind legs and faces, are wolves’. Their arms and torso are mostly human, though they are the size of bears. Their first victims are usually those who they have loved, and wolves cannot be killed.

Author quotation 
“We’re so lucky, living our normal lives in an equal, decent society. But what if we were dumped in some dark place where we had to kill to survive? Could we? What innocence would we lose along the way? ‘Jatta’ places young people in truly disturbing situations, watches them foul things up, lets their plans go disastrously wrong, and lets them discover their limits for themselves.”

External links 
http://www.jatta.com.au
http://www.jennyhaleillustration.com.au
http://www.margaretconnolly.com/?p=601
http://www.scholastic.com.au/common/books/contributor_profile.asp?

2009 Australian novels
Werewolf novels